Shriya Saran is an Indian actress and model who has appeared mostly in Telugu, Tamil and Hindi language films. She made her acting debut with the Telugu film Ishtam (2001) and had her first commercial success with Santosham (2002). The following year, she made her Hindi cinema debut with a supporting role in Tujhe Meri Kasam, alongside Riteish Deshmukh and Genelia D'Souza. It was followed by the commercially successful crime drama Tagore (2003), in which she was paired opposite Chiranjeevi. The same year, she played a supporting role in the Tamil-Telugu bilingual film Enakku 20 Unakku 18, which marked her debut in Tamil cinema. In 2005, she had ten releases including Mazhai, S. S. Rajamouli's Chatrapathi, and Mogudu Pellam O Dongodu, in which she was among the only three characters of the film. Saran's solitary release as a lead actress in 2006 was the Tamil film Thiruvilaiyaadal Aarambam.

In 2007, Saran was paired opposite Rajinikanth in S. Shankar's Sivaji. It was the most expensive film in Indian cinema and went on to become the highest grossing Tamil film to that point. The same year, she made a comeback to Hindi cinema with Mohit Suri's Awarapan, where she played a Muslim woman. Following that, she made her American cinema debut with James Dodson's The Other End of the Line (2008), in which she played an Indian woman who works in a call centre. Her subsequent releases include the Tamil films Kanthaswamy (2009) and Kutty (2010), and Pokkiri Raja (2010), which marked her debut in Malayalam cinema.

In 2012, Saran starred in Deepa Mehta's Midnight's Children, an English adaptation of Salman Rushdie's novel of the same name. The following years, she played a princess in Roopa Iyer's period fantasy drama Chandra; the film was shot simultaneously in Kannada and Tamil. In 2014, she played dual roles in the Telugu drama film Manam. Saran received critical acclaim for her performance and was nominated for the Best Supporting Actress – Telugu Award at the 62nd Filmfare Awards South. The following year, she appeared opposite Ajay Devgn in Drishyam, the Hindi remake of the Malayalam film of the same name, which became a box office success.

Film

Music videos

Notes

References

External links 

Indian filmographies
Actress filmographies